The culture of California is tied to the culture of the United States as a whole. However, there are features that are unique to California. With roots in the cultures of Spain, Asia, Mexico, and the eastern United States, California integrates foods, languages and traditions from all over the world.

Spain had explored the present state during the 16th century, although it did not colonize it and did not exert its cultural influence in earnest until the 18th century. By the 19th century, Spain had built missions throughout the state and California consisted of huge land extensions (called "ranchos"). From that time to the present, Hispanic Californians have always been among the largest cultural groups in the state. Furthermore, Mexican immigration into California has also resulted in a large share of cultural contributions. California was first settled by Native American tribes and the names of many cities in California are of Native American origin.

California culture has also been greatly influenced by Indigenous peoples of California as well as other large populations, especially immigrant groups from East Asia, Southeast Asia and Latin America. California is an international gateway to the United States.

California has long been a subject of interest in the public mind and has often been promoted by its boosters as a kind of paradise. In the early 20th Century, fueled by the efforts of state and local boosters, many Americans saw the Golden State as an ideal resort destination, sunny and dry all year round with easy access to the ocean, deserts, and mountains. In the 1960s, popular music groups such as the Beach Boys promoted the image of Californians as laid-back, tanned beach-goers.

In terms of socio-cultural mores and national politics, Californians are perceived as more liberal than most other Americans, especially those who live in the coastal or northern regions of California. The state, in whole, is perceived as liberal, though the northeast region (predominantly the area covering the California half of the proposed State of Jefferson) and certain parts of the southern region (i.e. Orange County) are more conservative. California is also home to many prestigious universities including Stanford University, the California Institute of Technology, the University of California, the University of Southern California, the California State University, Chapman University, and the Claremont Colleges.

The California Gold Rush of the 1850s is still seen as a symbol of California's modern economic style, a pioneering spirit that tends to generate technology, social ventures, entertainment, and economic fads and booms that, in many cases, are followed all around the globe.

The hippie movement began in San Francisco, California, in the early 1960s and progressed into the late 1970s.

Language
English is the main language of California's inhabitants. Spanish is a very common second language all over the state.

California English is a dialect of the English language spoken within California. California is the home to a highly diverse populace, and this is reflected in many other languages, especially Spanish. As is in the case of English is spoken in any state, not all features of California English is used by all speakers in the state, and not all features are restricted in use only to the state. However, there are some linguistic features which can be identified as either originally or predominantly Californian.

As the nation's major motion picture and television entertainment center, Hollywood has influenced English throughout the world, by making English speakers of many dialects very visible and by making known new terms and new meanings. The media outlets and entertainment industry based in California also popularizes the California English accent and dialect to the rest of the country and the world.

The official language of California has been English since the passage of Proposition 63 in 1986. However, many state, city, and local government agencies print official public documents in Spanish and other languages since Proposition 63 doesn't regulate how governments use other languages.

The Indigenous Farm worker Study of 2007-2009 found 23 languages of Mexico and Mesoamerica spoken in California.

California was once home to 300 Native American languages spoken by indigenous people.

Arts

Architecture

 
Apart from the architecture of the California missions and other colonial buildings, there are still many architectonic reminiscences of the Spanish period, especially in Southern California, where white stucco walls, red roof tiles, curvilinear gables, arched windows, balconies or even bell towers are incorporated into modern building styles in what is known as the Spanish Colonial Revival architecture, a United States architectural stylistic movement that came about in the early 20th century.

While Spanish architectural styles appear statewide, Northern Californian cities more prominently feature historic Victorian architecture, for which San Francisco is renowned, but which dominates the central historic districts of most Northern California towns. The towns of Eureka and Ferndale, in Humboldt County, are particularly noteworthy for their well-preserved Victorian building stock.

Today's architecture in California is a mixture of many other cultural influences that has resulted in groundbreaking modernist styles that have generated many other interesting and unusual building types.

Film

California is home to Hollywood (a district of Los Angeles), the center of the American film industry, which has given rise to the popular fashion movie-star image and stereotypical lifestyles such as beach-dwelling surfers.

Hollywood has had a profound effect on culture all across the world since the early 20th century.
During the so-called Golden Age of Hollywood, which lasted from the end of the silent era in American cinema in the late 1920s to the late 1950s, thousands of movies were released from Hollywood studios. Spectacular epics, which took advantage of new widescreen processes from the 1950s, have become increasingly popular.

Today, in spite of fierce competition from other countries and even other states within the US, California still dominates the industry.

Music

The guitar was the instrument that the Mexican state of Alta California chose and two composers for the instrument are represented in the collection. Manuel Y. Ferrer's were collected in a book of 144 pages, called "Compositions and Arrangements for the Guitar" published in San Francisco in 1882, then reprinted in Boston by Oliver Ditson in 1915. Many of his pieces appear in the sheet music collection. An additional Californian artist, of the name of Luis T. Romero is represented his 1889 arrangement for guitar of La Paloma by Yradier.

In 1898, a collection called "Characteristic Songs of the Spanish Californians" was published as Canciones del Pais de California" in Santa Barbara.

California is the birthplace of several internationally renowned music genres, including:

Alternative rock/metal, e.g. Beck, Deftones, Hole, Jane's Addiction, Rage Against the Machine, Red Hot Chili Peppers
Bakersfield sound, e.g. Buck Owens and the Buckaroos, Merle Haggard, Tommy Collins
Chicano rock, e.g. Carlos Santana, Linda Ronstadt, Los Lobos, Ritchie Valens, Rosie and the Originals, WAR
Cowpunk, e.g. The Blasters, The Gun Club, Social Distortion, X (band)
Experimental music, e.g. Beck, Captain Beefheart, Frank Zappa
Funk rock, e.g. Faith No More, Mr. Bungle, Primus, Red Hot Chili Peppers, WAR 
G Funk, e.g. Dr. Dre, Kendrick Lamar, Snoop Dogg, Warren G
Hardcore punk, e.g. Adolescents, Black Flag, Circle Jerks, Dead Kennedys
Hyphy, e.g. Mac Dre, E-40
Nu Metal, e.g. Korn, Papa Roach, P.O.D.
Paisley Underground
Psychedelic rock, e.g. The Doors, Grateful Dead, Jefferson Airplane, Moby Grape, Sly and the Family Stone
Reggae fusion, e.g. Dirty Heads, Iration, Rebelution, Slightly Stoopid, Stick Figure
Skate punk, e.g. Bad Religion, Blink-182, Descendents, Pennywise, Rancid, Suicidal Tendencies, NOFX, The Offspring
Stoner rock, e.g. Sleep, Kyuss
Soft rock, e.g. The Carpenters, The Doobie Brothers
Surf rock, e.g. The Beach Boys, The Chantays, Dick Dale & The Del Tones, Jan and Dean
Third wave ska with bands such as No Doubt, Reel Big Fish, Suburban Rhythm, Sublime
Thrash metal/Bay Area thrash metal, e.g. Exodus, Megadeth, Metallica, Slayer
West coast blues
West coast hip hop, e.g. Cypress Hill, E-40, Ice Cube, Kendrick Lamar, Kid Frost, N.W.A., Too Short, Tupac Shakur
West coast jazz

Other well-known artists from California from genres which did not necessarily originate in the state include:
Bolero, e.g. La Santa Cecilia 
Cumbia, e.g. Ozomatli
Hard Rock, e.g. Van Halen
Heavy metal: Blue Cheer, Guns N' Roses, Van Halen, Mötley Crüe
Latin rock: Santana, Ritchie Valens
Mariachi e.g. Mariachi los Camperos
Metalcore, e.g. As I Lay Dying, Atreyu, Of Mice & Men, Pierce the Veil, Secrets, A Skylit Drive, Stick to Your Guns, Wovenwar
Norteño, e.g. Los Tigres del Norte
Pop, e.g. Tiffany
Punk, e.g. Dead Kennedys, Circle Jerks, Green Day
Ranchera, e.g. Ángela Aguilar, Linda Ronstadt, 
Rock: Eagles, Counting Crows, Jane's Addiction, Journey, Creedence Clearwater Revival, The Byrds, Rage Against the Machine

There are many songs that mention the name of the state in some way, one of the most popular is the song Hotel California by the Eagles.

Literature

Notable authors who were either native to California or who wrote extensively about California include:
 Juan Bautista Zappa, the author of the "Estrella del Norte de México" published in Seville on 1668, that was known as the "guide for the spiritual conquest of the Californias".
 Miguel Venegas, who published "Noticia de la California" in 1757, that was subsequently translated into English (1759), Dutch (1761–1762), French (1766–1767), and German (1769–1770), becoming the standard source for information about the early Californias.
 Richard Henry Dana Jr., recounted aspects of Californio culture which he saw during his 1834 visit as a sailor in Two Years Before the Mast.
 Helen Hunt Jackson, depicted a portrayal of Californio culture in her novel Ramona (1884)
 John Steinbeck, was widely known as a regionalist, mystic, and proletarian writer. A prolific writer, he is one of the best known and read writers of the 20th Century.
 Gerald Haslam, "the quintessential California writer," whose fiction and non-fiction is set mainly in the Great Central Valley.
 Joan Didion, the author of five novels and eight books of nonfiction
 Wallace Stegner, known as the "Dean of Western Writers"
James D. Houston, protege of Stegner, whose novels and non-fiction helped define post-WWII California.
 Raymond Chandler, who wrote about the dark underbelly of mid-20th Century Los Angeles
 John Muir, who spent years in the Sierras and brought Yosemite to international prominence
 Ken Kesey, a counter-cultural figure; was an American author, best known for his novel, One Flew Over the Cuckoo's Nest
 Ross Macdonald (Ken Millar), his post WWII work refined the noir novel in California. 
 Richard Henry Dana Jr., who wrote about his 19th Century voyage to California and the namesake of Dana Point
 María Ruiz de Burton, the first female Mexican-American author to write in English; wrote The Squatter and the Don, under the pen name "C. Loyal".
 Dashiell Hammett, an American author of hardboiled detective novels and short stories
 James M. Cain, an American journalist and novelist
 James Ellroy, writer
 Jack Kerouac, author of On the Road
 John Fante, an American novelist, short-story and screenwriter of Italian descent.
 Charles Bukowski, a member of the Beat Movement.
 Robert Frost, poet, born and raised (until age 11) in San Francisco.
 Jack London, born in San Francisco.
 Frank Norris, who set several of his novels in California.
 Richard Brautigan, counterculture poet and writer, and one-time poet-in-residence at the California Institute of Technology, San Francisco resident
 Philip K. Dick, prominent Science Fiction writer.
 Frederick Kohner, Wrote the 1957 book about his daughter nicknamed Gidget The novel publication was seminal in the global dissemination of the Southern California Beach and Surf culture as both an influential book and film / television series.

Visual arts 
Several notable art movements have arisen in California. California Impressionism (also called California Plein-Air Painting) arose in the early 20th century as a regional variant of American Impressionism characterized by artists who worked outdoors directly from nature. It influenced the California Scene Painting movement, which flourished from the 1920s to the 1960s.

In the mid-20th century, the Bay Area Figurative Movement rejected the dominant abstract expressionism of the period. In the 1960s and 1970s, the Bay Area was the epicenter of the funk art movement, another figurative movement with an anti-establishment bent.

The Light and Space movement originated in Southern California in the 1960s. It is characterized by a focus on perceptual phenomena, such as in James Turrell's skyspace installations that frame the sky.

Museums

California has notable museums:
 The California Museum in the state capitol of Sacramento, CA is the official museum of the California State Archives. Originally named the Golden State Museum, it opened in June 1998 under the development of the Secretary of State's office to display contents of the state archives. Soon after her husband Governor Arnold Schwarzenegger was sworn in as governor in 2003, First Lady Maria Shriver began working with the Secretary of State and California State Parks to expand the Museum. In 2006, The California Museum became home to the California Hall of Fame, the most notable and diverse of all The California Museum's permanent exhibits.
 The Oakland Museum of California in Oakland. The Museum is dedicated to the history, natural sciences and art that define the people, history and the future of California.
 The Getty Center in Los Angeles. One of the wealthiest art museums in the world.
 Los Angeles County Museum of Art (LACMA)
 The Museum of Contemporary Art (MOCA) in Los Angeles.
 California Science Center, the West Coast's largest hands-on science center, in Los Angeles.
 The Natural History Museum of Los Angeles County, the largest natural and historical museum in the Western US.
 California Palace of the Legion of Honor in San Francisco. A fine art museum.
 San Francisco Museum of Modern Art in San Francisco.
 The Exploratorium in San Francisco. A hands-on museum of science, art, and human perception.
 California State Railroad Museum in Sacramento. Operated by the California State Parks system, the museum chronicles the history of railroads in California
 Colton Hall, signing place of The California Constitution
 California Academy of Sciences in San Francisco. One of the ten largest museums of natural history in the world.

Cuisine

California's many immigrants bring their culinary traditions to the state. Chinese, Mexican, Italian, Vietnamese, and Indian food, as well as many other foreign foods, can be found throughout California. In 1903, The Landmarks Club Cookbook (which was published as a fundraiser to restore California's Spanish missions) claimed that Los Angeles had the most diverse cuisine of any city.

Produce plays an important role in California cuisine. California encompasses many diverse climates and therefore is able to grow many types of produce. Additionally, California's Central Valley contains some of the most fertile soil in the world. California is the number one U.S. producer of many common fruits and vegetables, including broccoli, spinach, tomatoes and avocados, amongst others. A health-conscious culture also contributes to the popularity of fresh produce. Fruit festivals, such as the National Orange Show Festival in San Bernardino County, are common throughout the state.

Avocados play a special role in California cuisine. Many popular California dishes integrate avocados and/or guacamole. Avocados were unfamiliar to most Americans until the mid-20th century, when growers of the subtropical fruit successfully convinced many Americans to try it. In California, avocado is commonly used in sandwiches, hamburgers, salads and even on pizza, in addition to tacos, and other Mexican foods.

California is also an important producer of tomatoes. California tomatoes have become a staple ingredient in ketchup, though ketchup was originally made with everything from plums to mushrooms.

With Napa Valley in the north, Santa Barbara, and the Temecula Valley in the southern part of the state, California is the world's fourth largest producer of wines, and accounts for 90 percent of the wine production in the United States. Originally started by Spanish settlers to create wine for Mass in the 18th century, the wine industry in California rivals other wine-producing countries of the world, such as France, Australia and Chile, even winning the Judgment of Paris wine competition.

Santa Maria, California is home to a unique type of barbecue, which normally encompasses beef, in particular tri tip, smoked over oak wood served with beans and salsa.

Veganism is popular in California.

McDonald's, In-n-Out, Jack in the Box, Original Tommy's, Rubio's, Round Table Pizza, Taco Bell, Del Taco, Jamba Juice, Carl’s Jr., California Pizza Kitchen, Wienerschnitzel and The Cheesecake Factory have origins in California.

Environmentalism
California has a reputation for environmentalism. Californians, especially those living on the coasts, are viewed as being advocates of environmental issues. The environmental culture of California can be partly attributed to public outrage at the major oil spill in the Santa Barbara Channel in 1969. The influential social conditions resulting from this oil spill are explained in detail by environmental sociologist Harvey Molotch.

In 1965, California became the first state to regulate vehicle exhaust by setting limits on hydrocarbons and carbon monoxide emissions.  In 1967, the California EPA set the nation's first air quality standards for total suspended particulates, photochemical oxidants, sulfur dioxide, nitrogen dioxide, and other pollutants. The United States Congress has allowed California to set its own pollution standards, and the state's legislators have responded with some of the strongest environmental laws ever passed.

Some Californians are concerned about the rising water levels that will be caused by global warming which will threaten areas along the coast.  Additionally, with warming trends at their present rates, experts generally agree that the Sierra Nevada snowpack, which is crucial to the state's drinking water, could decline by approximately 50 percent.

California's Water Board's regulation of PFOA and PFASs have the strictest notification level requirements in the Nation.

Education

Public universities and colleges

California offers a unique three-tier system of public postsecondary education:
The preeminent research university system in the state is the University of California (UC), which employs more Nobel Prize laureates than any other institution in the world, and is considered one of the world's finest public university systems. There are nine general UC campuses (most notably at Berkeley and Los Angeles), and a number of specialized campuses in the UC system.

The California State University (CSU) system has over 400,000 students, making it the largest university system in the United States. It is the oldest public institution of higher learning in the State of California, and is intended to accept the top one-third (1/3) of high school students. The CSU campuses were originally separately-established normal schools, but are now organized in a comprehensive university system, awarding Bachelor's, Master's, and Doctoral degrees.

The California Community Colleges system provides lower division courses. It is composed of 115 colleges, serving a student population of over 2.9 million.

Private universities and colleges

California is also home to such notable private universities as Stanford University, the Claremont Colleges, the California Institute of Technology (Caltech), and the University of Southern California (USC).  California has hundreds of other private colleges and universities, including many religious and special-purpose institutions.

Public secondary education consists of high schools that teach elective courses in trades, languages, and liberal arts with tracks for gifted, college-bound and industrial arts students.  California's public educational system is supported by a unique constitutional amendment that requires 40% of state revenues to be spent on education.

Beach culture

The state's proximity to the ocean influences many aspects of California culture and daily life. Surfing is a popular sport in California, where the famed spots of Trestles, Rincon, Mavericks, The Wedge, Malibu, and "Surf City, USA" reside. Some of the world's most renowned surf companies, including Hurley, Quiksilver, Volcom, O'Neill, Body Glove, RVCA are all headquartered in California. Older surfers such as Corky Carroll, Robert August, Hobie Alter as well as some of today's most renowned surfers, including Bobby Martinez, Dane Reynolds, Tom Curren, Taylor Knox, and Rob Machado are all from California.  Many surfing magazines are also headquartered in California, including Surfing Magazine, Surfer (magazine), and Surfer's Journal.

In the 1960s, surfing became immensely popular due to surf rock bands like the Beach Boys, surf films like Bruce Brown's The Endless Summer, and Hollywood blockbusters like Gidget.  Due to this mainstream surf culture explosion, surfing soon embodied the ideal Californian lifestyle and became a teen sensation as well as a sport.  Malibu, California was at the heart of surf culture not only because it is a world-class surf spot, but also due to its youthful "beach" atmosphere and warm weather.  Young men began strutting around the beach in boardshorts and women wore more revealing bikini swim suits, which, along with the surfboard, became symbols of beach culture. The surf culture boom of the 1960s soon led to an enormous increase of surfers at beaches around the country and helped surfing develop into the sport it is today.

Surfing (particularly in Southern California) has its own slang, which has coincided with Valspeak.  Words like "tubular", "radical", and "gnarly" and the overuse of the word "like" are associated with both. In the late 1960s, Santa Cruz and Northern California developed their own slang like "groovy", "hella", and "tight". However, the majority of these terms have fallen out of use across the state.

Northern–Southern California rivalry

Although unified as a single state, northern California and southern California share a rivalry. "NorCal" or "SoCal" pride is a large part of many residents' culture.

This has historically manifested through differences in regional dialect, as well as politics. Southern California has historically been more conservative in comparison to northern California. Northern California has been more liberal, to the point that the term "San Francisco values" has become a pejorative among conservatives in both state and national politics. An early example of this divide was the 1860 Presidential election, in which Southern Democrat John C. Breckinridge won in the southern counties, while the more populous San Francisco Bay Area carried the entire state for Abraham Lincoln.

The rivalry also manifests itself in professional sports, such as rivalries between the following teams:
 San Francisco Giants and the Los Angeles Dodgers in baseball
 Oakland Athletics and the Los Angeles Angels, also in baseball
 San Jose Sharks and both the Anaheim Ducks and Los Angeles Kings in hockey
 San Jose Earthquakes and the Los Angeles Galaxy in soccer
 Both the Golden State Warriors and Sacramento Kings and the Los Angeles Lakers and Los Angeles Clippers in basketball
 San Francisco 49ers and Los Angeles Rams in football

Sureños and Norteños are rival groups of gangs that, except in rare exceptions, strongly follow a northern-southern divide in territory

See also

 History of California
 California Myth
 Cuisine of California
 Music of California
 California Mille
 Cannabis in California
 List of California state symbols
 Indigenous peoples of California#Society and culture
 Culture of Asia
 Culture of Spain
 Culture of Mexico
 Demographics of California
 Hispanics and Latinos in California
 Asian Americans in California

References

Bibliography

External links

 California Arts Council
 California Council for the Humanities
 Art California Web Portal
Collection: "California" from the University of Michigan Museum of Art
Gallery of California Art from the Oakland Museum of California

Further reading 
California: the Dream and the Challenge in the Twenty-first Century by Kevin Starr
 Portrait of California: History & Culture ?A State is Born